Bangaru Usha Rani, is the Member of Legislative Assembly of Andhra Pradesh, India.  She represents the Indian National Congress party.  She was elected to the Andhra Pradesh Assembly from the Palakollu constituency on 16 May 2009 by defeating the Praja Rajyam President Konidella Chiranjeevi with good majority.

Political career 
She was a Municipal Chairperson for the town of Palakollu. She was the Member of Andhra Pradesh Legislative Assembly with the Indian National Congress for 2009–2014 term. She belongs to the Arya Vysya community .

See also 
Palakol (Assembly constituency)

References

Living people
Women members of the Andhra Pradesh Legislative Assembly
Indian National Congress politicians from Andhra Pradesh
Andhra Pradesh MLAs 2009–2014
People from West Godavari district
21st-century Indian women politicians
21st-century Indian politicians
Year of birth missing (living people)
Politicians from Palakollu